Wolfgang Nitschke (born 3 March 1947 in Waldenburg, Saxony) is a German former wrestler who competed in the 1972 Summer Olympics.

References

External links
 

1947 births
Living people
People from Waldenburg, Saxony
Olympic wrestlers of East Germany
Wrestlers at the 1972 Summer Olympics
German male sport wrestlers
Sportspeople from Saxony